Julien Reverchon (1837–1905) was a French botanist. He was born on 3 August 1837 in Diémoz and died on 30 December 1905.

He was the son of Maximilian and Florine Jacques Reverchon. His father was a follower of the ideas of Charles Fourier (1772–1837), and he decided to join Victor Prosper Considerant (1808–1893) in La Réunion (Dallas), near Dallas, Texas. Julien, who displayed an interest in the natural world at a young age, had already amassed a collection of nearly 2,000 species of plants with his brother.

The family arrived at La Réunion in December 1856 and learned of the failure of the Fourier colony. Jacques Reverchon then bought a small farm in the vicinity. Julien began to study the local flora. He married Marie Henri on 24 July 1864; they had two sons who died of typhoid fever in 1884.

After abandoning botany for a few years, he started collecting plants in 1869, when he made an expedition to collect fossils with Jacob Boll (1828-1880) in West Texas. With subsequent collections, he contributed to the production of noted floras by Asa Gray (1810–1888) and Charles Sprague Sargent (1841–1927) and the enrichment of many American collections. He taught botany at the end of his life in Dallas. At the time of his death, more than 2,600 species were cultured in his farm, and he possessed a rich herbarium of 20,000 specimens. Today, it is kept at the Missouri Botanical Garden in St. Louis . The city of Dallas named Reverchon Park in his honor.

References

1837 births
1905 deaths
19th-century French botanists